Tomashi Jackson (born 1980) is an American multimedia artist working across painting, video, textiles and sculpture. Jackson was born in Houston, Texas, raised in Los Angeles, and currently lives and works in New York, NY and Cambridge, MA. Jackson was named a 2019 Whitney Biennial participating artist. Jackson also serves on the faculty for sculpture at Rhode Island School of Design. Her work is included in the collection of MOCA Los Angeles. In 2004, a 20-foot-high by 80-foot-long mural by Jackson entitled Evolution of a Community was unveiled in the Los Angeles neighborhood of West Adams.

Artistic practice 
Jackson's work investigates the relationships between the aesthetic and the political. Jackson references layered content bridging historical actions with shifting artistic structures.

Her multimedia practice draws from Josef Albers' research on color relativity, "resulting in works with exuberant color, bold geometry, and intricate layerings of material." Jackson first became interested in Albers' work while studying painting and printmaking at Yale University. At the time she noted that the language Albers used to describe color perception phenomenon mirrored the language around racial segregation found in education policy and the transcripts of civil rights court cases fought by Thurgood Marshall and the NAACP Legal Defense and Education Fund. This analysis led Jackson to use color theory as an aesthetic strategy to investigate and connect past and present. "Color theory and human rights are conceptually interwoven in my paintings," said the artist. "I find the language comparisons appropriate metaphors for a critique of racism rather than a critique of categories of race."

Incorporating images painted from photographs and other materials chosen for their formal qualities, Jackson's work "bridges gaps between geometric experimentation and the systematization of injustice."

Jackson is interested in movement and migration, in particular how these activities are curtailed for populations of color. Her project at the 2019 Whitney Biennial compared people of color losing their homes in the 19th century, when Seneca Village was razed to become part of Central Park, with homeowners in Brooklyn recently losing their homes under a controversial policy known as third-party transfer.

She was included in the 2019 traveling exhibition Young, Gifted, and Black: The Lumpkin-Boccuzzi Family Collection of Contemporary Art.

Education 
Jackson received her BFA from Cooper Union in 2010, MS from the MIT School of Architecture and Planning in 2012, and MFA in Painting and Printmaking from the Yale School of Art in 2016.

Teaching 
She has lectured and taught at Cooper Union, Massachusetts College of Art and Design, Rhode Island School of Design, UMass Dartmouth, Boston University, School of Visual Arts, and New York University.

Curatorial work 
Jackson's curatorial work includes Publication-Schmublication at The Broadway Gallery, New York (December 2008), Drawing Atmosphere at Super Front Architectural Exhibition Space, New York (March 2008) Fever Grass: A Brief Study of Collective Memory and Waste Management in Dangriga, BZ. at The Cooper Union, New York (November 2008), and Everything There and Not There at The Broadway Gallery, New York (August 2008).

Exhibitions

Selected solo exhibitions 
 2014 - Love Economy: Emerging Visions of the African American Experience, Michigan State University, East Lansing, MI
 2016 - The Subliminal Is Now, Tilton Gallery, New York, NY
 2018 - Interstate Love Song, Zuckerman Museum of Art, Kennesaw State University, Kennesaw, GA
 2019 - Time Out of Mind, Tilton Gallery, New York, NY
 2020 - Forever My Lady, Night Gallery, Los Angeles, CA
 2020 – Love Rollercoaster, The Wexner Center for the Arts at Ohio State University, Columbus, OH 
 2022 – SLOW JAMZ, Neuberger Museum of Art at Purchase College, SUNY, Purchase, NY 
TBA - Platform: Tomashi Jackson, Parrish Art Museum, Water Mill, NY

Selected group exhibitions 
 2012 - Brucennial, MoMA PS1
 2016 - Black Women Artists for Black Lives Matter, New Museum
 2017 - In the Abstract, Mass MoCA
 2019 - Whitney Biennial, curated by Rujeko Hockley and Jane Panetta
2020 - Slowed and Throwed: Records of the City Through Mutated Lenses, Contemporary Arts Museum Houston
 Her work has been included in the 2016, 2017, 2018, and 2019 Art Basel Miami Beach as well.

Publications 

 The seen, the unseen, and the aesthetics of infrastructure. S.M. in Art, Culture, and Technology; Massachusetts Institute of Technology, Dept. of Architecture 2012
 Tomashi Jackson: Interstate Love Song, Jan. 27-May 6, 2018. Kennesaw, GA: Bernard A. Zuckerman Museum of Art, 2018.
 Whitney Biennial 2019: exhibition, New York, Whitney Museum of American Art, May 17-September 22, 2019. New York, NY: Whitney Museum of American Art. copyright 2019
 Hinge Pictures: Eight Women Artists Occupy the Third Dimension, Catskill, New York: Siglio Press; New Orleans, LA: Contemporary Arts Center, 2019.

References

External links
The Linguistic Overlap of Color Theory and Racism - Hyperallergic
Rhythm and Blues: Tomashi Jackson by Cora Fisher

1980 births
Living people
21st-century American painters
African-American painters
Yale School of Art alumni
MIT School of Architecture and Planning alumni
Cooper Union alumni
20th-century American painters
21st-century American women artists
African-American women artists
Artists from Houston